The 1933–34 National Hurling League was the seventh edition of the National Hurling League, which ran from 15 October 1933 until 25 March 1934.

Limerick defeated Dublin by 3-6 to 3-3 in the final.

Limerick also won the All-Ireland Championship in 1934, the third time that a team completed the league-championship double.

National Hurling League

Results

External links
 1933-34 National Hurling League results

References

National Hurling League seasons
League
League